The Lebanese Rugby League Federation (LRLF) is the governing body for rugby league football in Lebanon. They are full members of the Rugby League European Federation and full members of the Rugby League International Federation.

The Lebanese Rugby League moved from its original headquarters in Sydney, Australia and is now based in Safra in Lebanon.

History
A group of Australian-born rugby league players with Lebanese heritage, mostly from inner-city Sydney formed a Lebanese national side with a view to entering the 2000 Rugby League World Cup. They were accepted into the qualifying tournament on the agreement that they would aim to develop rugby league within Lebanon.

The Lebanese Rugby League Committee was formed in 2003 with Mohammed Habbous as president. It was initially based in Sydney, Australia.

The Lebanese Rugby League Committee was awarded full federation status in Lebanon on 30 December 2009.

In 2010 the LRL changed its logo, adopting a competition submission by Bashir Srour of Beirut. The design incorporates a representation of a rugby league ball, the cedar of the Lebanese flag and the numerals "XIII" symbolising rugby league. The use of the colour red represents "strength and power" while the green represents the cedar. The sharp edges of the font used for "LRLF" represent the intensity and roughness of the sport.

See also
Rugby league in Lebanon

References

External links

2003 establishments in Lebanon
Sports organizations established in 2003
Rugby league in Lebanon
Rugby league governing bodies
Rugby league